Katsutoshi (written: 勝敏, 勝利, 勝俊, 勝年 or 克俊) is a masculine Japanese given name. Notable people with the name include:

, Japanese footballer
, Japanese sumo wrestler
, Japanese politician
, Japanese ice hockey player
, Japanese admiral
, Japanese composer
, Japanese sport wrestler
, Japanese volleyball player
, Japanese Nordic combined skier
Katsutoshi Shiina (born 1961), Japanese karateka
, Japanese handball player
, Japanese volleyball player

Japanese masculine given names